The Atlantic was built in 1903 by Townsend and Downey shipyard, and designed by William Gardner, and Frederick Maxfield Hoyt (yacht designer) for Wilson Marshall. The three-masted schooner was skippered by Charlie Barr who was accompanied by navigator and tactician Frederick Maxfield Hoyt  when it set the record for fastest transatlantic passage by a monohull in the 1905 Kaiser's Cup race. The record remained unbroken for nearly 100 years.

Her speed and elegance have made her the subject of a book.

Trans-Atlantic sailing record
In 1905, Kaiser Wilhelm II of Germany proposed a race across the North Atlantic and put forward a solid gold cup to be presented to the winner. Eleven boats including the Kaiser's yacht Hamburg, George Lauder Jr's schooner the Endymion which was the record holder going into the race, and the schooner Atlantic skippered by Charlie Barr, with navigator and tactician Frederick Maxfield Hoyt took part.

The competitors encountered strong winds and gales which ensured a fast passage time and all  eleven boats finished the race.  Atlantic won, breaking the existing record with a time of 12 days, 4 hours, 1 minute and 19 seconds.  The record stood for 75 years until broken by Eric Tabarly sailing the trimaran Paul Ricard.  However Atlantic'''s monohull record stood for nearly 100 years until was broken in 1997 by the yacht Nicorette completing the crossing in 11 days 13 hours 22 minutes. For ships sailing in an organised regatta (as opposed to solo crossings, where the ship can wait for optimal sailing conditions), the record held for nearly 100 years and was only broken by Mari-Cha IV, crossing during the 2005 Rolex Transatlantic Challenge.

United States Navy Service

Following the United States declaration of war on Germany in April 1917, Atlantic was acquired by the Navy on 10 June 1917 and commissioned as USS Atlantic II (SP 651) on 28 July 1917.

She was assigned to Patrol Force, Atlantic Fleet, and cruised along the east coast until November 1917 when she was assigned duty as a guard ship at Yorktown, Va., and tender to a squadron of submarine chasers. In January 1919 she was assigned to the 5th Naval District.

She was decommissioned on 11 June 1919 at the Norfolk Navy Yard in Portsmouth, Virginia.  She was sold to a private owner on 24 July 1919.

Coast Guard ServiceAtlantic was acquired by the Coast Guard and commissioned on 1 April 1941.  She was assigned hull number WIX-271. She was assigned to Coast Guard Headquarters but was stationed at the United States Coast Guard Academy in New London, Connecticut where she was used for cadet training.  She was decommissioned on 27 October 1947 and sold to a private owner on 10 September 1948.

Later Years
In 1953, the ship was towed to Wildwood, New Jersey where it was a kept as a floating tea room, museum, and tourist attraction. She was neglected and sank in 1963 during a storm but was refloated in 1970. She deteriorated and sank at the dock in Norfolk, Virginia. In 1982, the wreckage was removed for the installation of a floating dry dock at Metro Machine Shipyard.

Her rudder is located at the Museum of Yachting in Newport, Rhode Island.

Honors and awards
Kaiser's Cup
World War I Victory Medal
American Defense Service Medal
American Campaign Medal
World War II Victory Medal

Replica
Ed Kastelein commissioned a full-sized replica of Atlantic, built at the Van der Graaf BV'' shipyard (consulting engineer: Doug Peterson) in Hardinxveld-Giessendam (Netherlands). The initial launch took place in March 2008, and the schooner was completed in June 2010.

Sophie Kastelein-Bouakel contributor, designed and built the interior of the Atlantic replica

Michael Vedder designed and built the interior of the Atlantic replica.

See also 
Yacht racing
2005 Rolex Transatlantic Challenge
List of large sailing yachts
List of schooners

References

External links
Original New York Times notice of Atlantic's victory in the race for the Kaiser's Cup
The Schooner Atlantic replica

Individual sailing vessels
Schooners of the United States
1900s sailing yachts
Lost sailing vessels
1903 ships
Maritime incidents in 1982
Ships built on the River Thames